Elizabeth Drake is an Australian composer. Her film soundtrack credits include Road to Nhill and Japanese Story

Discography

Albums

Awards and nominations

AACTA Awards
Nominated. 1997 AACTA Award for Best Original Music Score for Road to Nhill
Winner. 2003 AACTA Award for Best Original Music Score for Japanese Story

ARIA Award
Nominated. 2004 ARIA Award for Best Original Soundtrack, Cast or Show Album for Japanese Story

Film Critics Circle of Australia Awards
Nominated. 1998 Best Music Score for Road to Nhill
Winner. 2003 Best Music Score for Japanese Story

IF Awards
Nominated. 2004 Best Music for Japanese Story

Screen Music Awards
Winner. 2004 Best Feature Film Score for Japanese Story

References

External links
 
 Elizabeth Drake, episode 6, Prima Donna Podcast
 

APRA Award winners
Australian film score composers
Australian women film score composers
Living people
Year of birth missing (living people)